Mad as a hatter is a colloquial English phrase suggesting insanity.

Mad as a hatter may also refer to:

 "Mad as a Hatter", an episode of Batman: The Animated Series
 "Mad as a Hatter", an episode of The Real Housewives of Dallas (season 1)
 "Mad as a Hatter", an episode of Ladies of London
 Mad As A Hatter (EP), by Def Wish Cast, 1993, and a track on the EP
 Mad as a Hatter, an album by Shadowland, 1996 
 "Mad as a hatter", part of mnemonic for features of anticholinergic syndrome

See also 
 Mad Hatter (disambiguation)
 Hatter (disambiguation)
 Erethism, or mad hatter disease
 Mad as a March hare